César Chávez Middle School may refer to any one of a number of middle schools named after California union organizer César Chávez:

 César Chávez Academy, the elementary-middle school of the Chávez Huerta K-12 Preparatory Academy (Pueblo, Colorado)
 César Chávez Middle School, in the New Haven Unified School District, in Union City, California
 César Chávez Middle School (Lynwood, California)
 César Chávez Middle School (Oceanside, California)
 César Chávez Middle School (San Bernardino, California)
 César Chávez Middle School (Union City, California)
 César Chávez Middle School (Watsonville, California)
 César Chávez Middle School (Detroit, Michigan)
 César Chávez Middle School (Mission, Texas)
 César Chávez Middle School (Waco, Texas)

Middle schools in California
Middle schools in Michigan
Middle schools in Texas